Rui Cardoso may refer to:
Rui Cardoso Martins (born 1967), Portuguese writer
Rui Cardoso (footballer, born February 1994), Portuguese footballer who plays as a defender
Rui Cardoso (footballer, born May 1994), Portuguese footballer who played as a forward